Xinghua is a township of Hong'an County in northeastern Hubei province, China, located adjacent to and southeast of the county seat. , it has 42 villages under its administration.

Geography

Administrative divisions
, Xinghua administered:

See also 
 List of township-level divisions of Hubei

References 

Township-level divisions of Hubei